is a 1961 Japanese film directed by Kinji Fukasaku and starring Sonny Chiba. It is a sequel to Drifting Detective: Tragedy in the Red Valley. It was filmed in black and white with mono audio.

Plot

Cast

 Sonny Chiba
 Shigemi Kitahara
 Harumi Sone
 Junya Usami
 Takashi Kanda
 Yayoi Furusato

References

External links 
 
 Drifting Detective: Black Wind in the Harbor at allcinema in Japanese
 Drifting Detective: Black Wind in the Harbor at Japanese cinema db in Japanese 
 Drifting Detective: Black Wind in the Harbor at Kinenote in Japanese

1961 films
1960s Japanese-language films
Japanese black-and-white films
Japanese detective films
Japanese sequel films
Films directed by Kinji Fukasaku
1960s Japanese films